Tuysaravandan (also Romanized as Tūysarāvandān; also known as Tūrān Sarā, Tū Sarāvandān, Tūsarāvandān, and Tūsarvandān) is a village in Howmeh Rural District, in the Central District of Rasht County, Gilan Province, Iran. At the 2006 census, its population was 1,073, in 299 families.

References 

Populated places in Rasht County